Orangetree is a census-designated place (CDP) in Collier County, Florida, United States. The population was 4,406 at the 2010 census, up from 950 in 2000. It is part of the Naples–Marco Island Metropolitan Statistical Area.

Geography

Demographics

2020 census

As of the 2020 United States census, there were 5,896 people, 1,521 households, and 1,339 families residing in the CDP.

2000 census
As of the census of 2000, there were 950 people, 327 households, and 292 families residing in the CDP. The racial makeup of the CDP was 95.05% White, 1.26% African American, 0.11% Native American, 0.21% Asian, 0.11% Pacific Islander, 1.89% from other races, and 1.37% from two or more races. Hispanic or Latino of any race were 13.58% of the population.

There were 327 households, out of which 45.0% had children under the age of 18 living with them, 80.1% were married couples living together, 6.4% had a female householder with no husband present, and 10.7% were non-families. 10.1% of all households were made up of individuals, and 2.4% had someone living alone who was 65 years of age or older.  The average household size was 2.91 and the average family size was 3.07.

In the CDP, the population was spread out, with 30.3% under the age of 18, 3.6% from 18 to 24, 32.6% from 25 to 44, 23.4% from 45 to 64, and 10.1% who were 65 years of age or older.  The median age was 35 years. For every 100 females, there were 100.8 males.  For every 100 females age 18 and over, there were 95.3 males.

The median income for a household in the CDP was $56,645, and the median income for a family was $57,614. Males had a median income of $39,297 versus $26,071 for females. The per capita income for the CDP was $20,616.  None of the families and 1.7% of the population were living below the poverty line, including no under eighteens and none of those over 64.

Education
Orangetree's public schools are operated by the District School Board of Collier County. Residents are zoned to Corkscrew Elementary School and Middle School, and Palmetto Ridge High School, all in Orangetree.

Weather
In 2016, the Bulletin of the American Meteorological Society announced that Orangetree experiences more lightning than any other location in the United States, with around 200 flashes of lightning per square mile each year.

References

Census-designated places in Collier County, Florida
Census-designated places in Florida